Musa balbisiana, also known simply as plantain, is a wild-type species of banana. It is one of the ancestors of modern cultivated bananas, along with Musa acuminata.

Description
It grows lush leaves in clumps with a more upright habit than most cultivated bananas.  Flowers grow in inflorescences coloured red to maroon.  The fruit are between blue and green. They are considered inedible because of the seeds they contain.

Taxonomy
It was first scientifically described in 1820 by the Italian botanist Luigi Aloysius Colla.

Distribution
It is native to eastern South Asia, the eastern regions of the Indian subcontinent, northern Southeast Asia, and southern China. Introduced populations exist in the wild, far outside its native range.

Uses
It is assumed that wild bananas were cooked and eaten, as farmers would not have developed the cultivated banana otherwise. Seeded Musa balbisiana fruit are called butuhan ('with seeds') in the Philippines, and kluai tani (กล้วยตานี) in Thailand, where its leaves are used for packaging and crafts. Natural parthenocarpic clones occur through polyploidy and produce edible bananas, examples of which are wild saba bananas.

See also
List of banana cultivars
Plantain
Nang Tani

References

External links

Musa balbisiana
A type of wild banana

balbisiana
Plants described in 1820